The Rangau Railway is the railway line from Fürth via Zirndorf to Cadolzburg. In the local dialect it used to be known as the Cadolzburger Moggerla ("Moggerla" is East Franconian for "calf").

External links 

 Route description at Nahverkehr Franken (private)
 The Rangau Railway as an H0 model layout (private)

Branch lines in Bavaria
Fürth
Buildings and structures in Fürth (district)